Wiluyu Janq'u Uma or Wiluyu (Aymara wila red, uyu corral, yard, janq'u white uma water, "red corral white water" or "red corral", also spelled Viluyo Jankhouma, Viluyo) is a mountain in the Cordillera Real in the Andes of Bolivia, about  high. It is located in the La Paz Department, Larecaja Province, Sorata Municipality. It lies northwest of the mountain Yapuchañani, northeast of Misk'i T'ant'a and Uma Jalanta and east of Illampu.

References 

Mountains of La Paz Department (Bolivia)